Southern Maryland is the home of the first person of African descent to be elected to and serve in a legislature in America. His name was Mathias de Sousa and he was one of the original colonists to arrive in 1634. Southern Maryland is also the place where Josiah Henson was enslaved, and the place of brutality he wrote about in his later autobiography, which became the basis for Harriet Beecher Stowe's "Uncle Tom's Cabin". A descendant of Josiah Henson, Mathew Henson, was also from Southern Maryland and he was one of the first people to reach the North Pole along with Admiral Peary in 1909. There are so many more stories than these, both of triumph and of pain, of subjugation and of perseverance. Come walk the paths of these remarkable people and help us all to remember them.

Slavery in Maryland 

Maryland did not begin as an "official" slave state, although the founders were possible slave traders. It began, as with the story of Mathias de Sousa, as a place that any person that arrived as an indentured servant, could become a free person after they had served the time of their indentureship. Tragically, this did not last. The first slaves arrived in Maryland in 1642 and by 1694 persons of African descent, and their descendants, could be enslaved throughout the colony.

Notable Individuals

Mathias de Sousa 
Mathias de Sousa was one of the nine indentured servants brought to Maryland by Jesuit missionaries, and was on the Ark when Lord Baltimore's expedition arrived in the St. Mary's River in 1634. He was one of the first individuals of African descent to settle in the Maryland colony. His indenture was finished by 1638, and he became a "freemen" (a term for any man who was not a servant). Mathias became a mariner and fur trader. In 1641, he commanded a trading voyage to the Susquehannock and in 1642 was master of a small cargo vessel. Mathias was elected to and served in the 1642 legislative assembly of freemen. This makes Mathias de Sousa the first man of African descent to participate in an Assembly or Legislature in America.

Josiah Henson 
Josiah Henson was an author, abolitionist, and minister. Born into slavery on June 15, 1789 in Charles County, Maryland, he was sold three times before the age of eighteen. He escaped to Upper Canada in 1830 and founded a settlement and laborer's school for other fugitive slaves in Kent County, Canada. Henson's autobiography, The Life of Josiah Henson, inspired Harriett Beecher Stowe to write "Uncle Tom's Cabin".

Matthew Henson 
Matthew Henson was an American explorer best known as the co-discoverer of the North Pole with Admiral Robert Edwin Peary in 1909.

A year after the Civil War ended, Matthew Henson was born on August 8, 1866 to freeborn African American sharecroppers in Charles County, Maryland, and he was believed to be great-grandnephew of Josiah Henson. This famed African American explored the Arctic with Admiral Peary for two decades. On April 6, 1909, Peary, Henson and the rest of their team made history, becoming the first people to reach the North Pole. Matthew Henson died in New York City in 1955.

Notable Locations

Historic Sotterley 
An historic plantation circa 1703, Sotterley has built itself into a premier location for exploring the complicated past of the region. This unique historic setting has transformed its mission into one of inclusion and exploration. Sotterley Mission Statement: "To preserve our historic structures and natural environment and use the powerful stories of our land, lives, and labor to bring American history to life while serving as an educational and cultural resource."

Sotterley Vision Statement: "To foster a better understanding of our world today by providing a living link to America's complex history and legacy of slavery."

Through the Descendants Project and the UNESCO Slave Route Project, Historic Sotterley will continue to be powerful place to visit in Southern Maryland.

Biscoe Gray Heritage Farm 
The Biscoe Gray Heritage Farm, a site rich in natural and cultural resources, is a living laboratory to explore, understand, and experience Southern Maryland agricultural practices and lifestyles throughout its history—from Native American settlement, small scale colonial farming, 1800's era agriculture and 20th century tobacco farming to contemporary community supported agricultural and sustainable farming efforts.

The rehabilitation of the George E. Rice House and outbuildings provides an important aspect of interpreting the African American history of the site; they illustrate early to mid-20th century small-scale farming, as well as the role of African Americans as landowners and tenant farmers. Their preservation is vital to understanding African American heritage and culture in the region, and conveys the story of the Rice family and their connection to the land, and the ways in which African Americans shaped the physical and social landscape of Southern Maryland at the time.

African Americans in Maryland are residents of the state of Maryland who are of African-American ancestry. As of the 2010 U.S. Census, African Americans were 30% of the state's population.

Early history

In the 1630's, the colonial settlement of St. Mary's City was founded. Soon, the first African slaves were imported into the Province of Maryland by 1642 to develop the economy in a similar way to Virginia, with tobacco being the commodity crop, which was labor-intensive. In 1755, about 40% of Maryland's population was African Americans and most of them enslaved.  The populations were concentrated in the Tidewater counties around Chesapeake Bay where tobacco was grown.

Changes in the main commodity crops to others less labor-intensive alternatives after the American Revolutionary War led numerous slaveholders to free their slaves before or at the time of their death. As a result, the percentage of  black people that were free grew from less than 1% to 10% in the Upper South.  By the time of the American Civil War a bit more than 49% of African Americans in Maryland were free. The boys, denied education, were torn from their parents and sold South, to their lives as farm animals in the growing new territories of Missouri, Arkansas, and Texas. Marylanders and Virginians viewed themselves as breeders, centers of slave production, for export to other states.

Beginning in 1816, a new way to deal with the growing numbers of freed slaves began in Maryland with the Maryland State Colonization Society. Its purpose was to form a colony of freed slaves back into Africa by forming Republic of Maryland in what is today, Liberia.  This experiment had limited success as part of the abolitionist movement.  However, the rapid expansion of the cotton industry in the Deep South after the invention of the cotton gin greatly increased demand for slave labor, and the Southern states continued as slave societies.  Maryland was one of the key states in the Underground Railroad with cities such as Baltimore and Cambridge focal points for transported the fugitives further north. Slavery in Maryland officially ended with the writing of the new Maryland Constitution of 1864; however, emancipation did not mean equality as the franchise was restricted to "white" males. Notably, the Maryland legislature refused to ratify both the 14th Amendment, which conferred citizenship rights on former slaves, and the 15th Amendment, which gave the vote to African Americans.

Civil War to civil rights

The Civil War impacted the African-Americans in Maryland in several ways with a few large battles and many smaller skirmishes fought in Maryland, but also with the status of the enslaved being bought further into question. Although emancipation would not begin until near the end of the war in Maryland, the possibility for escaped slaves increased during the war and the numbers of contraband swelled with many seeking refuge in D.C. The beginning of the war saw African-Americans pressed into service for manual labor in Union Army camps and building defenses throughout the state, both free men and escape slaves; but others chose to travel to states where they were allowed to enlist.  The Slave codes were replaced by the Black codes in restricting the rights of African-Americans until the Jim Crow laws took effect to limit civil rights protections and continue the codified segregation that lasted until the mid-1900s.

Negro children were required to attend schools by 1872, but these schools were to be governed by existing county and district boards, which were already struggling to provide adequate education to white children.  Maryland was required to pay black and white teachers equally by 1941, based on a case argued by Thurgood Marshall.  In 1955, schools in Maryland were forced to start the process of integration with Brown v. Board of Education in 1954 and this process not completed until 1967, with mixed success.

Lynchings such as those of Joseph Vermillion, Michael Green, Matthew Williams, William Burns and Stephen Williams were not unheard of and were used for intimidation affect, with the last recorded lynching occurring in 1933 in Princess Anne, Maryland.  Laws criminalizing marriage and sex between white and black people were enacted in colonial era Maryland, and not repealed until just before the Supreme Court ruled on Loving v. Virginia in 1967, further reinforcing segregation in the state.

The 13th Amendment ended slavery and the 14th Amendment extended full rights of citizenship to African Americans.  The continuation of support for Jim Crow and segregation laws led to protests in which many African-Americans were violently injured out in the open at lunchroom counters, buses, polling places and local public areas. These protests did not eradicate racism, but they forced racism to become used in more coded or metaphorical language instead of being used out in the open.

Civil Rights era

Following the example of student sit-ins as those in Greensboro, NC, by the spring of 1960, students from Morgan State College began their own sit-in in Baltimore department stores restaurants.  While such protests continued in Maryland, by 1961, the Freedom Riders began rolling through the state as they headed further into the deep South, from Washington D.C.  The 1960s continues with rallies, marches, protests and riots with the largest of and most violent happening in 1968 upon hearing of the death of Martin Luther King jr. in 1968.  Notable among the unrest is Cambridge riot of 1963, Cambridge riot of 1967 and Baltimore riot of 1968.

Notable African Americans of Maryland

 Freddy Adu
 Benjamin Banneker
 Eubie Blake
 Toni Braxton
 Cab Calloway
 Lewis Charlton, former slave
 Harry A. Cole
 Harry S. Cummings
 Robert Curbeam
 Decatur Dorsey, former slave
 Father Divine
 Frederick Douglass, former slave
 Charles S. Dutton
 Crystal Bird Fauset
 Charity Folks, former slave
 William C. Goodridge, former slave
 Frances Harper 
 Josiah Henson, former slave and inspiration for Uncle Tom
 Matthew Henson
 Bryant Johnson
 Delano Johnson
 Joshua Johnson (painter)
 LaKisha Jones
 Mother Mary Lange
 Thurgood Marshall
 Clarence Mitchell Jr.
 Parren J. Mitchell
 John H. Murphy Sr., former slave
 Pauli Murray
 Isaac Myers
 James W.C. Pennington, former slave
 Hasim Rahman
 Gloria Richardson
 Michael Steele
 Vivien Thomas
Charles Albert Tindley
 Harriet Tubman, former slave
 Charles Uncles
 Verda Welcome
 Clifton Reginald Wharton Sr.
 Mo'Nique
 Dave Chappelle
 Jada Pinkett Smith

See also

History of Maryland
 History of the Jews in Maryland
 Native American tribes in Maryland
 Amish in Maryland
 History of the African Americans in Baltimore
 History of slavery in Maryland
 Maryland-in-Africa
 Reginald F. Lewis Museum of Maryland African American History & Culture
 Atlantic Creole
 Chesapeake Colonies
 Colonial South and the Chesapeake
 Slavery in the colonial history of the United States
 Tobacco colonies
 Demographics of Maryland
List of African-American newspapers in Maryland
White Americans in Maryland
Asian Americans in Maryland
Hispanics and Latinos in Maryland
Amish in Maryland
Mennonites in Maryland

References

External links

 Maryland Commission on African American History & Culture
 African Americans in Maryland, Individual Biographical Files 
 Guide to African American Sources, Maryland Historical Society: 
 Discover African-American History in Maryland
 African Presence in Maryland
https://www.hopkinsmedicine.org/diversity/_documents/400_Years_of_AfricanAmerican_History_in_Maryland_FINAL.pdf&ved=2ahUKEwjQ_-ik4qz6AhXWif0HHSzDDxkQFnoECBMQAQ&usg=AOvVaw0vWGioy8NCkgEIu_5quRA3